Fairs is a surname. Notable people with the surname include:

 Caroline Fairs (born 1983), Australian female rugby union player and army officer
 Eric Fairs (born 1964), American football player
 Henry Fairs (born 1976), English organist
 Marcus Fairs (1967–2022), British editor
 Nigel Fairs (born 20th century), British actor and writer

See also
 Fair (surname)
 Fair (disambiguation)
 Faires (surname)